William Wrighton Eustace Ross [often misspelt William Wrightson Eustace Ross] (June 14, 1894 – August 26, 1966) was a Canadian geophysicist and poet. He was the first published poet in Canada to write Imagist poetry, and later the first to write surrealist verse, both of which have led some to call him "the first modern Canadian poet."

Life

Ross was born on 14 June 1894 in Peterborough, Ontario, to Ralph and Ella Louise Ross (née Wrighton). He grew up in Pembroke, Ontario. He studied geophysics at the University of Toronto, supporting his studies with summer work on geological surveys in Northern Ontario.

It has been said that the poems of "North" "present the northern Ontario landscape in the stark manner of the Group of Seven. His strongest work is undoubtedly this early imagist-oriented poetry, work that derives its strengths from his restrained, skeptical personality, from his scientist's preference for objective, factual material, and from his affection for the Canadian wilderness landscape." This is poetry which, as he wrote in 'On National Poetry' (Canadian Forum, 1944), is 'distinctly located' in a geographic 'locale.'

Sonnets
"Exhilarated by the knowledge that he had succeeded" in Laconics — "a knowledge that came to him from inner self-realization rather than popular success" — Ross next "turned his new-found strength, in Sonnets, to the conditions under which poetry had been written in the past. His purpose was ... to reduce tradition to the structures of the method that had tested out in Laconics."

The book "reveals a lesser-known side of Ross — the classicist and traditional metricist concerned not only with factual reality but also with spiritual truth." Sonnets was meant to be more overtly philosophical than Laconics — which Ross thought would be better suited by the traditional form's longer lines — but ultimately he considered the book an experiment that failed:

The general idea was to employ the 'clean' language of free verse without the lack of rhythm or pattern which offended me in all the latter except some of Pound etc. As regards Sonnets I had the notion that longer lines were needed to express ideas adequately and the sonnet form seemed suited to this purpose. I was ditched by my inability to carry over into them — the prestige of the models being so great — the aforesaid 'cleanness.'

Legacy

"Ross's private and somewhat trenchant nature, together with his diffidence toward publishing and the publicly lived literary life, caused him to be little known during his lifetime except to fellow poets." He "was never fully accepted into the company of the 'moderns' — Livesay, Smith, Gustafson and so forth — because unlike them he was not interested in propagating the future any more than he was interested in perpetuating the past.... Ross was well-read in Canadian, European and American poetry, yet he cut his own work free from any direction that this reading might have suggested for his verse. His poetry is unique in its timelessness."

"Ross's writing became of special importance in the 1950s and 1960s when new generations of Canadian poets sought their precursors in the modernist goals of restraint, precision, organic rhythm, and the factual image."

Publications
 Laconics (by E.R.) 1930.
 Sonnets (by E.R.) 1932.
 Experiment, 1923–1929. Toronto: Contact Press, 1956.
 Shapes & sounds: poems of W. W. E. Ross (with a portrait by Dennis Burton, a memoir by Barry Callaghan, and an editorial note by Raymond Souster and John Robert Colombo). (Toronto: Longman's 1968) 
 Irrealities, Sonnets & Laconics. (Exile Editions, 2003)

Anthologized poems
 "The Diver," "If Ice," "The Snake Trying," The New Oxford Book of Canadian Verse in English. Ed. Margaret Atwood. Toronto: Oxford University Press, 1983.

References

External links 

Ross Family archival papers held at the University of Toronto Archives and Records Management Services

1894 births
1966 deaths
20th-century Canadian poets
20th-century Canadian geologists
Canadian geophysicists
Canadian modernist poets
Canadian World War I poets
20th-century Canadian male writers
Canadian male poets
Writers from Ontario
Sonneteers
Canadian Expeditionary Force soldiers
Deaths from cancer in Canada